BEA Finance Tower is a 198-metre skyscraper in Lujiazui, Shanghai. Bank of East Asia locates its Mainland China headquarter here, with lower levels for other companies. The building is formerly called Gaobao Finance Tower, but later changed its name at the end of 2008.

See also 
 List of tallest buildings in Shanghai

References

External links 
 BEA Finance Tower on The Skyscraper Center

Skyscraper office buildings in Shanghai
2009 establishments in China
Bank of East Asia
Pudong